Comapa is a municipality in the department of Jutiapa in southeastern Guatemala.

References

Municipalities of the Jutiapa Department